Laurel Hill Cemetery is a historic garden or rural cemetery established in 1836 in the East Falls neighborhood of Philadelphia, Pennsylvania. The 74-acre grounds contain over 11,000 family lots and more than 33,000 graves, including many notable burials.

A 
  Robert Adams Jr. (1849–1906), U.S. Congressman
 Oscar Allis, M.D. (1838–1921), surgeon, inventor of the Allis clamp

B 
 Franklin Bache (1792–1864), great-grandson of Benjamin Franklin, chemist, physician
 Hilary Baker (1746–1798), mayor of Philadelphia
 Matthias W. Baldwin (1795–1866), founder of Baldwin Locomotive Works
 Wharton Barker (1846–1921), 1900 Candidate for U.S. President with Populist Party
 John Rhea Barton (1794–1871), surgeon, namesake of Barton's fracture
 Charles Ezra Beury (1879–1953), banker, 2nd president of Temple University, namesake for Beury Building
 Alexander Biddle (1819–1899), Union Army officer in the U.S. Civil War
 Henry H. Bingham (1841–1912), brevet brigadier general, Medal of Honor recipient
 Robert Montgomery Bird (1803–1854), novelist, playwright, and physician
 David Bispham (1857–1921), opera singer
 George A.H. Blake (1810–1884), cavalry officer in the U.S. Army
  Charles E. Bohlen (1904–1974), U.S. diplomat
 Francis Bohlen (1868–1942), legal scholar at the University of Pennsylvania
 Henry Bohlen (1810–1862), Civil War Union brigadier general
 George Henry Boker (1823–1890), poet, playwright, and diplomat
 Joseph Bonnell (1802–1840), West Point graduate, hero of the Texas Revolution
 Adolph E. Borie (1809–1880), Secretary of the Navy
 John Bouvier (1781–1851), jurist and legal lexicographer
 Charles Brown (1797–1883), U.S. Congressman
 George Bryan (1731–1791), colonial Pennsylvania businessman and politician

C 
 Hampton L. Carson (1852–1929), influential legal scholar and historian
 Robert N. Carson (1844–1907), streetcar magnate, gave money to found Carson College for Orphan Girls
 Lewis C. Cassidy (1829–1889), Pennsylvania State Attorney General
  John Cassin (1813–1869), ornithologist
 George William Childs (1829–1894), newspaper publisher
 Thomas Clyde (1812–1885), founder of the Clyde Line of steamers
 William P. Clyde (1839–1923), shipping magnate
 Meredith Colket (1878–1947), Silver Medal winner pole vault, 1900 Summer Olympics
 Walter Colton (1797–1851), Chaplain, Alcalde of Monterey, author, publisher of California's first newspaper
 David Conner (1792–1856), U.S. naval officer
 Robert T. Conrad (1810–1858), mayor of Philadelphia
 Joel Cook (1842–1910), U.S. Congressman
 Robert Cornelius (1809–1893), pioneering photographer, took first selfie in 1839
 Martha Coston (1826–1904), inventor of Coston flare and businesswoman
 Thomas Jefferson Cram (1804–1883), engineer in the U.S. Corps of Topographical Engineers
 William Cramp (1807–1879), shipbuilder
 Elliott Cresson (1845–1868), Philadelphia painter for whom the William Emlen Cresson Memorial Traveling Scholarship is named
 Samuel W. Crawford (1829–1892), Civil War Union army general
 Alexander Cummings (1810–1879), third Governor of the Territory of Colorado
 Louisa Knapp Curtis (1851–1910), journalist, editor Ladies' Home Journal, wife of Cyrus H. K. Curtis

D 
  John A. Dahlgren (1809–1870), U.S. naval officer, inventor of the Dahlgren gun
 Ulric Dahlgren (1842–1864), Union Army Captain during the Civil War, namesake of The Dahlgren Affair
 Richard Dale (1756–1826), Revolutionary War naval officer
 Henry Deringer (1786–1868), gunsmith
 Franklin Archibald Dick (1823–1885), attorney, politician and military officer
 Hamilton Disston (1844–1896), industrialist and real-estate developer
 Henry Disston (1819–1878), businessman, Disston Saw Works
 Ida Dixon (1854–1916), socialite, first female golf course architect in the United States
 Gustavus Savage Drane (1789–1846), apocryphal inspiration for The Cask of Amontillado
 Percival Drayton (1812–1865), U.S. Navy officer
 William Drayton (1776–1846), politician, banker and writer
 William Duane (1760–1835), journalist
 William Duane (1872–1935), physicist
 William J. Duane (1780–1865), politician, lawyer, United States Secretary of the Treasury in 1833
 Louis Adolphus Duhring (1845–1913), professor of dermatology at University of Pennsylvania
 Frank Dumont (1848–1919), minstrel performer and entrepreneur, wrote "The Witmark Amateur Minstrel Guide and Burnt Cork Encyclopedia"
  Stephen Duncan (1787–1867), Mississippi planter and banker
 Robley Dunglison, (1798–1869), "Father of American Physiology", personal physician to Thomas Jefferson
 Nathan Dunn (1782–1844), businessman, philanthropist and sinology pioneer
 John Price Durbin (1800–1876), Chaplain of the United States Senate, president of Dickinson College

E 
 George Meade Easby (1918–2005), great-grandson of General George Meade and a celebrity figure
 George Nicholas Eckert (1802–1865), U.S. Congressman
 William Lukens Elkins (1832–1903), businessman, inventor, art collector
 Charles Ellet Jr. (1810–1862), civil engineer
 Charles Rivers Ellet (1843–1863), Colonel in the Union Army during the U.S. Civil War
 Alfred L. Elwyn (1804–1884), Physician and pioneer in the education of the mentally disabled
 Jehu Eyre (1738–1781), businessman, veteran of the French and Indian War and American Revolutionary War

F 
 Wes Fisler (1841–1922), professional baseball player, nickname "The Icicle"
 Edwin Henry Fitler (1825–1896), 75th mayor of Philadelphia
 Wilmot E. Fleming (1916–1978), Pennsylvania State Representative and Senator
 Robert H. Foerderer (1860–1903), U.S. Congressman
 Stanley Hamer Ford (1877–1961), U.S. Army general
 Adam Forepaugh (1831–1890), entrepreneur, businessman, and circus owner
 Anne Francine (1917–1999), actress and cabaret singer
 John Fries Frazer (1812–1972), Vice Provost of the University of Pennsylvania
 Samuel Gibbs French (1818–1910), Confederate major general has a cenotaph in his family's plot in Laurel Hill.
 Harriet Whitney Frishmuth (1880–1980), sculptor
 A.B. Frost (1851–1928), illustrator, graphic artist and comics writer
  Frank Furness (1839–1912), architect, Medal of Honor recipient
 Horace Howard Furness (1833–1912), Shakespearean scholar
 William Henry Furness (1802–1896), clergyman, theologian, Transcendentalist, abolitionist, and reformer
 William Henry Furness III (1866–1920),  physician, ethnographer and author; he is in the Thomas Eakins painting The Agnew Clinic

G 
 William Evans Garrett Gilmore (1895–1969), Olympic rower 1924 Summer Olympics, 1932 Summer Olympics
 Charles Gilpin (1809–1891), Mayor of Philadelphia from 1851 to 1854
 Henry D. Gilpin (1801–1860), U.S. Attorney General
 Joshua Gilpin (1765–1840), paper manufacturer
 George Gliddon (1809–1857), English-born American Egyptologist
 Louis Antoine Godey (1804–1878), editor and publisher
 Thomas Godfrey (1704–1749), optician and inventor
 Sylvanus William Godon (1809–1879), U.S. Naval officer
 Frederick Graff (1775–1847), hydraulic engineer, designer of the Fairmount Water Works
 George Rex Graham (1813–1894), Magazine editor and publisher
 Frederick Gutekunst (1831–1917), prominent photographer

H 
 Henry Schell Hagert (1826–1885), Philadelphia district attorney
  Sarah Josepha Hale (1788–1879), writer, poet, instigator of Thanksgiving as a national holiday
 Frederick Halterman (1831–1907), U.S. Congressman
 James Harper (1780–1873), U.S. Congressman
 Ferdinand Rudolph Hassler (1770–1843), first superintendent of the United States Coast Survey
 A. G. Heaton (1844–1930), artist, author and leading numismatist
 Joseph Hemphill (1770–1842), U.S. Congressman
 Alexander Henry (1823–1883), mayor of Philadelphia from 1858 to 1865
 Henry Beck Hirst (1813–1874), poet, companion of Edgar Allan Poe
 Henry Wilson Hodge (1865–1919), civil engineer, bridge designer
 Emily Elizabeth Holman (1854–1925), better known by her professional name of E.E. Holman, she was one of the first female architects in Pennsylvania
 Lucy Hamilton Hooper (1835–1893), poet, journalist, editor and playwright
 Hub (1958–2021), Leonard Nelson Hubbard, bass player for The Roots
 Isaac Hull (1773–1843), Commodore, USN, captained Constitution to victory over HMS Guerriere

J 
 Caroline Furness Jayne (1873–1909), ethnologist, expert in children's game cat's cradle
 Horace Jayne (1859–1913), zoologist and educator; the Horace Jayne House is on the National Register of Historic Places
 Owen Jones (1819–1878), U.S. Congressman
 James Juvenal (1874–1942), Olympic rower, 1900 Summer Olympics, 1904 Summer Olympics

K 
 Harry Kalas (1936–2009), Philadelphia Phillies Hall of Fame broadcaster
  Elisha Kent Kane (1820–1857), polar explorer
 John K. Kane (1795–1858), U.S. District Judge, Attorney General of Pennsylvania
 William D. Kelley (1814–1890), U.S. Congressman
 Florence Kelley (1859–1932), social and political reformer
 Samuel George King (1816–1899), 73rd mayor of Philadelphia
 James Kitchenman (1825–1909), carpet manufacturer
 Lon Knight (1853–1932), professional baseball player

L 
 Elie A. F. La Vallette (1790–1862), U.S. Navy, one of first rear admirals appointed in 1862
 Henry Charles Lea (1825–1909), historian
 Isaac Lea (1792–1886), conchologist, geologist and publisher
 Mathew Carey Lea (1823–1897), chemist and lawyer, father of mechanochemistry
 Napoleon LeBrun (1821–1901), architect
 Mary Ann Lee (1823–1899), professional ballerina
 Michael Leib (1760–1822), U.S. Congressman
 Thomas Leiper (1745–1825), American Revolutionary War veteran, first American to construct a permanent working railway
 Lewis Charles Levin (1808–1860), U.S. Congressman
 Rachel Lloyd (1839–1900), first U.S. woman to receive Ph.D. in chemistry
 George Horace Lorimer (1868–1937), editor-in-chief of The Saturday Evening Post
 Harry Luff (1856–1916), Major League Baseball player
 Anna Lukens (1844–1917), physician

M 
 Charles Macalester (1798–1873), businessman, banker, philanthropist and namesake of Macalester College
 Alexander Kelly McClure (1828–1909), Pennsylvania State Senator
 George Deardorff McCreary (1846–1915), U.S. Congressman
 Jack McFetridge (1869–1917), Major League Pitcher with Philadelphia Phillies
 Thomas McKean (1734–1817), lawyer and politician, Signer of the Declaration of Independence
 Morton McMichael (1807–1879), editor The Saturday Evening Post, publisher The North American, veteran American Civil War. Mayor of Philadelphia (1866–1869)
  George Gordon Meade (1815–1872), Civil War Union Army major general, victor at the Battle of Gettysburg
 Charles Delucena Meigs (1792–1869), obstetrician who opposed anesthesia
 George Wallace Melville (1841–1912), U.S. Navy Admiral, engineer, Arctic explorer, author
 Hugh Mercer (1726–1777), Continental general in the American Revolution
 Samuel Mercer (1799–1862), Union naval officer
 Helen Abbott Michael (1857–1904), plant chemist
 Charles Karsner Mills, M.D. (1845–1930), "dean of American neurology"
 William Millward (1822–1871), U.S. Congressman
 E. Coppée Mitchell (1836–1887), Professor and Dean of the University of Pennsylvania Law School
 James T. Mitchell (1834–1915), Justice of the Supreme Court of Pennsylvania from 1889 to 1903, Chief Justice from 1903 to 1910
 John Moffet (1831–1884), U.S. Congressman-elect
 Edward Joy Morris (1815–1881), U.S. Congressman
 Roland S. Morris (1874–1945), U.S. Ambassador to Japan, President of American Philosophical Society
 James St. Clair Morton (1829–1864), Union Army general in the Civil War
 Samuel George Morton (1799–1855), physician, natural scientist and writer
 Alexander Murray (1755–1821), American officer during the Revolutionary War

N 
 Henry Morris Naglee (1815–1886), Union Army general during the U.S. Civil War
 Charles Naylor (1806–1872), U.S. Congressman
 Matthew Newkirk (1794–1868), businessman, railroad president
 Albert Newsam (1809–1864), famed deaf artist who created paintings and drawings, including portraits
 Thaddeus Norris (1811–1877), "Uncle Thad," the "Father of American Fly Fishing"
 John Notman (1810–1865), architect and designer of Laurel Hill

O 
 Joshua T. Owen (1822–1887), Union brigadier general during the Civil War

P 
 Samuel Longstreth Parrish (1849–1932), bibliophile, founder Parrish Art Museum
 Francis E. Patterson (1821–1862), Union general in the Civil War
 Robert Patterson (1743–1824), mathematician, Director United States Mint 1805–1824
 Robert Maskell Patterson (1787–1854), chemist, mathematician, physician, Director United States Mint 1835–1851
 Robert Patterson (1792–1881), Irish-born United States major general during the American Civil War
 Franklin Peale (1795–1870), 3rd chief coiner at United States Mint at Philadelphia
 Titian Peale (1799–1885), artist
  John C. Pemberton (1814–1881), Confederate Civil War general
 Garrett J. Pendergrast (1802–1862), U.S. Civil War naval officer
 Mary Engle Pennington (1872–1952), U.S. scientist and refrigeration pioneer
 Boies Penrose (1860–1921), U.S. Senator
 Charles B. Penrose (1798–1857), Pennsylvania State Senator and Solicitor of the U.S. Treasury
 Charles Bingham Penrose (1862–1925), physician, inventor of Penrose Drain
 J.W. Pepper (1853–1919), sheet music publisher, musical instrument maker, inventor of the sousaphone
 William Pepper (1843–1898), physician, Provost of University of Pennsylvania, founder Free Library of Philadelphia
 Charles Jacobs Peterson (1818–1887), author, publisher Peterson's Magazine
 Hannah Mary Bouvier Peterson (1811–1870), author of "Bouvier's Familiar Astronomy" and The Young Wife's Cookbook
 Henry Peterson, (1818–1891), editor for The Saturday Evening Post, novelist, poet, playwright, and abolitionist
 Alonzo Potter (1800–1865), third Episcopal bishop of the Diocese of Pennsylvania

R 
 Samuel J. Randall (1828–1890), U.S. Congressman
 George C. Read (1788–1862), U.S. Naval officer
 Thomas Buchanan Read (1822–1872), poet, sculptor, portrait-painter
 Joseph Reed (1741–1785), Continental Congressman
 John E. Reyburn (1845–1914), U.S. Congressman, mayor of Philadelphia
  William S. Reyburn (1882–1946), U.S. Congressman
 Benjamin Wood Richards (1797–1851), mayor of Philadelphia
 Jacob Ridgway (1768–1843), merchant and diplomat
 David Rittenhouse (1732–1796), astronomer, inventor, mathematician, surveyor
 John Robbins (1808–1880), U.S. Congressman
 Moncure Robinson (1802–1891), civil engineer and railroad planner
 Fairman Rogers (1833–1900), civil engineer, educator and philanthropist, subject of Thomas Eakins painting The Fairman Rogers Four-in-Hand
 William Ronckendorff (1812–1891), U.S. Naval officer
 Richard Rush (1780–1859), U.S. Attorney General

S 
 John Morin Scott (1789–1858), mayor of Philadelphia from 1841 to 1844
 John Sergeant (1779–1852), U.S. Congressman and 1832 Republican vice presidential nominee
 Jonathan Dickinson Sergeant (1746–1793), Continental Congressman
 Adam Seybert (1773–1825), U.S. Congressman
 George Sharswood (1810–1883), Pennsylvania jurist, Chief Justice of the Supreme Court of Pennsylvania
 William Short (1759–1849), Private secretary and "adopted son" for Thomas Jefferson
  William M. Singerly (1832–1898), businessman and newspaper publisher
 Arthur Donaldson Smith (1866–1939), physician, hunter, explorer of Africa
 Charles Ferguson Smith (1807–1862), Civil War Union Army general
 John Rowson Smith (1810–1864), panorama painter
 John T. Smith (1801–1864), U.S. Congressman for Pennsylvania's 3rd congressional district from 1843 to 1845
 Persifor Frazer Smith (1798–1858), U.S. Army officer
 Richard Penn Smith (1799–1854), playwright, wrote fake biography of Davy Crockett
 A. Loudon Snowden (1835–1912), politician, diplomat, superintendent of Philadelphia Mint
 James Ross Snowden (1809–1878), director United States Mint 1853–1861
 William Clinton South (1866–1938), color photography pioneer, violin maker and collector
 John Batterson Stetson (1830–1906), hat manufacturer, reinterred to West Laurel Hill Cemetery
 Christine Wetherill Stevenson (1878–1922), cofounder Plays and Players Theatre, Philadelphia Art Alliance, and Hollywood Bowl
 Sara Yorke Stevenson (1847–1921), archaeologist specializing in Egyptology, cofounder University of Pennsylvania Museum of Archaeology and Anthropology, suffragist
 Alfred Stillé (1813–1900), expelled from Yale for Conic Sections Rebellion, received medical degree from University of Pennsylvania, president American Medical Association
 William S. Stokely (1823–1902), 72nd mayor of Philadelphia
 Witmer Stone (1866–1939), ornithologist, botanist
 Alfred Sully (1820–1879), soldier, painter, actor
 Rosalie Sully (1818–1847), painter, daughter of Thomas, had affair with actress Charlotte Cushman
 Thomas Sully (1783–1872), portrait painter
 William Swaim (1781–1846), inventor of Swaim's Panacea

T 
  M. Louise Thomas (1822–1907), social reformer
 Charles Thomson (1729–1824), secretary of the Continental Congress
 George Washington Toland (1796–1869), U.S. Congressman
 Laura Matilda Towne (1825–1901), abolitionist and educator
 George Alfred Townsend (1841–1914), Civil War correspondent, author
 Levi Twiggs (1793–1847), U.S. Marine Corps officer
 Hector Tyndale (1821–1880), Union general during the American Civil War and protector of the wife of abolitionist John Brown
 Job Roberts Tyson (1803–1858), U.S. Congressman

V 
 Pinkerton R. Vaughn (1841–1866), Medal of Honor recipient
 Richard Vaux (1816–1895), U.S. Congressman, mayor of Philadelphia
 William Sansom Vaux (1811–1852), mineralogist

W 
 Thomas Ustick Walter (1804–1887), architect
 John Price Wetherill (1844–1906), industrialist, namesake for the Franklin Institute John Price Wetherill Medal, 1917–1997
 Joseph Wharton (1826–1909), industrialist who founded the Wharton School at the University of Pennsylvania, co-founded the Bethlehem Steel company, and was one of the founders of Swarthmore College
 Stephen French Whitman (1823–1888), chocolatier, founder Whitman's
 Eleanor Elkins Widener (1861/1862–1937), wife of George Dunton Widener, survivor of RMS Titanic sinking, responsible for Harry Elkins Widener Library at Harvard University
 George D. Widener Jr. (1889–1971), thoroughbred racehorse owner
 Joseph E. Widener (1871–1943), thoroughbred owner/breeder
  Peter A. B. Widener (1834–1915), business tycoon, philanthropist
 Jonathan Williams (1751–1815), U.S. Army officer and first superintendent of West Point
 John Rhea Barton Willing (1864–1913), music enthusiast and violin collector
 Joseph Lapsley Wilson (1844–1928), railroad executive, author, horticulturalist, Captain of First City Troop, 1889–1894; subject of Thomas Eakins painting
 John Caspar Wister (1887–1982), one of the United States' most highly honored horticulturists, first director of John J. Tyler Arboretum
 Langhorne Wister (1834–1891), Union Army officer
 Owen Wister (1860–1938), novelist, author of The Virginian
 George Bacon Wood (1797–1879), physician, professor, and writer
 William B. Wood (1774–1861), theater manager, actor
 Charles Stewart Wurts (1790–1859), coal merchant, founder Delaware and Hudson Canal; helped launch anthracite industry in U.S.
 John Wyeth (1834–1907), chemist, with brother founder Wyeth pharmaceuticals

Z 
 Jacob Zeilin (1806–1880), 7th Commandant of the U.S. Marine Corps, Marine Corps's first general officer
 J. Fred Zimmerman Jr. (1871–1948), theatre manager and stage producer
 J. Fred Zimmerman Sr. (1843–1925), theatre magnate

References 

Burials at Laurel Hill Cemetery
Laurel Hill Cemetery